The Cuero River, also known as the Cuero and Salado River, is a river to the east of San Juan Pueblo and forming part of the Wildlife Refuge Cuero and Salada in Honduras.

See also
List of rivers of Honduras

References

External links
Rand McNally, The New International Atlas, 1993.
CIA map: :Image:Honduras rel 1985.jpg
UN map: :Image:Un-honduras.png
Google Maps

Rivers of Honduras